The Great Blizzard of 1891 affected Southern England between 9 and 13 March of that year. A merchant vessel, the Bay of Panama was one of the casualties, driven onto rocks on the south coast of Cornwall by the storm. Twenty-three people died in this incident alone.

References

1891 in England
1891 meteorology
1891 natural disasters
March 1891 events
Disasters in Devon
Weather events in England
Southern England
Blizzards